The 1992 Lancashire Cup was the 80th and last occasion on which the Lancashire Cup completion was held. Wigan won the trophy by beating St. Helens by the score of 5-4 in the final.

Background 

The failure of London Crusaders to enter, due primarily to financial pressures, resulted in the number of entrants this year decreasing by one to 16.
This resulted in a full fixture list, with no requirement for a preliminary round, nor any “blank” or “dummy” fixtures or any byes.

Competition and results

Round 1 
Involved 8 matches (with no byes) and 16 clubs.

Round 2 - Quarter-finals 
Involved 4 matches and 8 clubs

Round 3 – Semi-finals 
Involved 2 matches and 4 clubs

Final 

The match was played at Knowsley Road, Eccleston, St Helens, Merseyside, (historically in the county of Lancashire). The attendance was 20,534.

Teams and scorers 

Scoring - Try = four points - Goal = two points - Drop goal = one point

The road to success

Notes and comments 
1 * The attendance is given as 3,500 in the Widnes official archives - RUGBYLEAGUEproject gives it as 3,499|| 
2 * The official Widnes archives give the attendance as 3,700 - RUGBYLEAGUEproject  data gives it as 3,733
3 * St Helens won the toss for the home advantage 
4 * Knowsley Road was the home ground of St. Helens from 1890 to 2010. The final capacity was in the region of 18,000, although the actual record attendance was 35,695, set on 26 December 1949, for a league game between St Helens and Wigan

Postscript 
To date, this was the last season for the Lancashire (and Yorkshire) Cup competitions, which except for the break due to the two World Wars, had taken place annually since its inauguration in the 1905–06 season.
It was fitting that the last name on the cup should be the same as the first,  that of Wigan, and that the last final should be between the two clubs which had the best records in the competition.
It was only after the two county finals had been played that it was announced that the competitions were to be scrapped; news which came as a major surprise and shock to the fans. The reasons given by the ruling body, the Rugby Football League,  were that it was deemed the cup was adding to fixture congestion for more successful sides and also that a local county cup did not fit the modern image of Rugby League.

Records from the Lancashire Cup competition

Club and individual records

Entrants, number of final & semi-Final appearances by clubs, and years 
This table lists all the semi-professional clubs which have entered the competition and the number (and dates) of their cup final wins, cup final runner-up spots, and losing semi-Final appearances.

See also 
1992–93 Rugby Football League season
Rugby league county cups

References

External links
Saints Heritage Society
1896–97 Northern Rugby Football Union season at wigan.rlfans.com 
Hull&Proud Fixtures & Results 1896/1897
Widnes Vikings - One team, one passion Season In Review - 1896–97
The Northern Union at warringtonwolves.org

RFL Lancashire Cup
Lancashire Cup